The National Union of Students of Saudi Arabia was founded in 1977. The organization was banned in Saudi Arabia, and functioned in exile in Syria. NUSSA held consultative membership in the International Union of Students.

References 

Youth organisations based in Saudi Arabia
1977 establishments in Saudi Arabia
Student wings of communist parties
Student organizations established in 1977